Anthony Whyte (born March 10, 1996) is a soccer player. Born in Canada, he represented Guyana internationally.

Career

Youth
He played youth soccer with Sigma FC, winning various youth titles. He trained and played in Holland for two years.

In 2014, he played college soccer with the Florida Southern Moccasins.

Club
In 2015, he joined Trinidad & Tobago club Morvant Caledonia United.

In 2016, he was on the roster for League1 Ontario club Sigma FC, but did not make any appearances.

In 2017, he played with North Mississauga SC.

International
In January 2015, he made contact with Faizal Khan, a national team recruiter for the Guyana national team, who gave him an opportunity to try out for the team, after being introduced by Jamaal Smith, another Canadian-born Guyanese national team player.

He played with the Guyana U23 team participating in Olympic qualifying.

He made his senior debut on March 29, 2015, playing all 90 minutes and keeping a clean sheet in a 2–0 win over Grenada. Afterwards, he earned call-ups to the senior team for World Cup qualifying.

Personal
His father hails from Campbellville, Guyana. His brother, Daniel Whyte, also played for the Guyana national team.

References

External links

1996 births
Living people
Association football goalkeepers
Sigma FC players
League1 Ontario players
North Mississauga SC players
Morvant Caledonia United players
Soccer players from Mississauga
Guyana international footballers
Guyana youth international footballers
Canadian soccer players
Florida Southern Moccasins men's soccer players